Maarohanye is a surname. Notable people with the surname include:

Jackie Maarohanye
Molemo Maarohanye, South African rapper